"S.O.S. (Let the Music Play)" is a song performed by American R&B and pop recording artist Jordin Sparks. It is the second single from her second studio album titled, Battlefield. The song was released first in New Zealand on August 14, 2009 and was sent to US radio on September 29, 2009. It was released in the United Kingdom on October 12, 2009.

"S.O.S. (Let the Music Play)" is a dance-pop song which contains a sample of "Let the Music Play" by Shannon. It combines 1980s synths with modern techno-dance beats. Sparks explained why she decided to go in a dancier direction with this song: "I'll always be the ballad girl from American Idol, but I wanted to try something new, though not so far that people wouldn't believe me." The video was shot in Los Angeles, California on August 10, 2009, with Chris Robinson serving as the director. He also worked with Sparks on the "No Air" music video.

As of May 2014, the single has sold 111,000 digital downloads in the United States.

Critical reception
Reviews for the song were generally positive with critics praising Sparks' attempt at dance-pop. Nick Levine of Digital Spy said "Two excursions into dance-pop territory, the stomping, Shannon-sampling 'SOS (Let The Music Play)' and the boyfriend-baiting 'Emergency (911)', also do the business". The New York Times said "intriguingly, the music on that song ('Emergency 911'), and another club track, 'S.O.S. (Let the Music Play)', evokes the brazen dance-pop of Lady Gaga." A critic from Rolling Stone criticized the album and said that Sparks' album "falls flat on 'S.O.S. (Let The Music Play),' a piece of bland disco that wishes it were 'Just Dance."  The Guardian appeared to praise Sparks for attempting a song that was more urban, stating that the "squelchy electronics and a relatively earthy lyric ('Look in her eyes, she's mentally undressing him') give 'SOS' an urban hue."

Entertainment Weekly commented that "second single 'S.O.S. (Let The Music Play)', with its refrain copped from Shannon's 1983 dance classic, may not be thrillingly original, but resistance is futile when Sparks, showing heretofore unseen vocal dexterity, takes to the dance floor to ward off a vixen who's barking up the wrong boyfriend."
In the New York Posts review of the album it was said that "there are a lot of vocal and tonal departures on this disc, nowhere more so than with the thumpin' 'S.O.S. (Let The Music Play)'. This straight-outta-the-80s track (which will be her next single) is my fave on the whole album -- it's techno-summer perfection. And the hook is divine, despite its unexpected ancestry."

 Promotion 
On August 25, 2009 it was announced that Sparks would be taking part in the 2009 VH1 Divas special on September 17, 2009 on VH1, where she performed the song.
On October 13, 2009, it was also performed on Channel 4's The Paul O'Grady Show, a UK chat show, and the following day on the National Lottery Show in the UK.

 Music video 
The video was shot in Los Angeles, California on August 10, 2009, with Chris Robinson serving as the director. He previously worked with Sparks on the music video for "No Air". The video shows Sparks dancing while wearing a gold dress and long gold nails. In interluding scenes in the video she can be seen dancing in a club wearing a black dress and hoodie. Her friend is seen unhappily watching her boyfriend flirt around other girls and texts Sparks. Eventually her boyfriend sees her and Sparks blows a kiss to the camera.

American actress Jennifer Freeman also featured in the music video.

Track listAustralian single'
"S.O.S. (Let the Music Play)" – 3:32
"S.O.S. (Let the Music Play)" (Buzz Junkies Remix) (Club Mix) – 5:21

Official version and remixes

Album/Single Version
Video Edit
Buzz Junkies Club Mix
Buzz Junkies Radio Edit
Jason Nevin's Club Mix/Extended Mix
Jason Nevin's Radio Edit

Personnel
Chris Barbosa – music, lyrics
Ed Chisolm – music, lyrics
Cutfather (Mich Hedin Hansen) – additional music and lyrics, production, percussion
Pilfinger (Lasse Kramhøft) – additional music and lyrics, production, keyboard, programming
David Kopatz – additional music and lyrics, production
Keely Hawkes – additional music and lyrics, backing vocals
Serban Ghenea – mixing
John Hanes – mix engineering
Tim Roberts – mix engineering assistant

Source:

Chart performance 
The song entered the UK singles chart 3 weeks previous to its release at 39, the following week rising to 18. It then peaked at number 15, a week before its physical release.  On October 18, it rose to number 13. It is also her highest peaking record in Sweden, where it peaked at number 7. Her previous highest peaking record in Sweden was "No Air" in 2008, which peaked at number 10. The song sold 12,000 downloads on the week of the album's release. The song's sales stands at 111,000 in the US as of February 18, 2010.
It is Sparks' first single to ever be number 1 on a US Chart (the Billboard Dance/Club play).

Charts

Year-end charts

Radio date and release history

References 

2009 singles
Jordin Sparks songs
Music videos directed by Chris Robinson (director)
Dance-pop songs
Songs written by Cutfather
Songs written by Chris Barbosa
2009 songs
Jive Records singles